is a railway station located in the city of Kitakami, Iwate Prefecture, Japan, operated by the East Japan Railway Company (JR East).

Lines
Fujine Station is served by the Kitakami Line, and is located 8.4 km from the terminus of the line at Kitakami Station.

Station layout
The station has two opposed side platforms connected to the station building by a level crossing. The station is unattended.

Platforms

History
Fujine Station opened on March 21, 1921. The station was absorbed into the JR East network upon the privatization of the Japan National Railways (JNR) on April 1, 1987.

Passenger statistics
In fiscal 2017, the station was used by an average of 158 passenger daily (boarding passengers only).

Surrounding area
 
Akita Expressway

See also
 List of railway stations in Japan

References

External links

 

Railway stations in Iwate Prefecture
Kitakami Line
Railway stations in Japan opened in 1921
Kitakami, Iwate
Stations of East Japan Railway Company